The Texas Cowboy Hall of Fame, a western, historical museum in Fort Worth, Texas, United States, "honors those men and women who have shown excellence in the business and support of rodeo and the western lifestyle in Texas."

The Hall of Fame includes over 125 cowboys and cowgirls, each of whom has a booth to display personal memorabilia. The museum, located in Historic Barn A, is also home to The Sterquell Wagon Collection, John Justin Trail of Fame, Chisholm Trail Exhibit, The Applewhite-Clark Exhibit, Adventures of the Cowboy Trail, Zigrang Horse Bit Collection, Amon G. Carter's 1933 Cadillac and The Jersey Lilly Old-Tyme Photo Parlour.

The Hall of Fame was established in 1997 and its original purpose was to recognize excellent horsemen and women. In 2001, the hall moved to the Fort Worth Stockyards National Historic District. Today the hall recognizes individuals from all facets of rodeo and western lifestyle. The building housing it is one of the horse and mule barns in the Fort Worth Stockyards.  Originally built in 1888, they housed over 3,000 horses and mules.  The original wooden ones that stood in this location were lost March 14, 1911, when a spark from a passing train ignited a fire.  They were rebuilt and completed in March 1912 and considered the first "fireproof" ones.  The bricks, columns, metal doors, catwalks, and cinder blocks are all original architecture. The Hall of Fame is located in the heart of the historic Fort Worth Stockyards.

Inductees

Source:

See also
List of museums in North Texas
National Cowboy and Western Heritage Museum in Oklahoma

References

External links
Official Website

Cowboy halls of fame
Halls of fame in Texas
State halls of fame in the United States
Museums in Fort Worth, Texas
American West museums in Texas
Biographical museums in Texas
Sports museums in Texas